Opportunity is an unincorporated community in Holt County, Nebraska, United States.

History
Opportunity was so named because its founders saw a good opportunity to establish a post office and store there.  The Opportunity post office operated between 1910 and 1942.

Notable person

Fern Hubbard Orme (1903–1993), Nebraska state legislator and educator, was born in Opportunity.

References

Unincorporated communities in Holt County, Nebraska
Unincorporated communities in Nebraska